Ubayd Allah, also spelled or transliterated Obaidullah, Obaydullah, Obeidallah, or Ubaydullah, is a male Arabic given name that means "little servant of God".

Given name

Obaidullah
 Obaidullah (detainee), an Afghan detainee held in Guantanamo
 Obaidullah (Bangladeshi cricketer), Bangladeshi cricketer
 Obaidullah (Pakistani cricketer), Pakistani cricketer
 Obaidullah (Kandahar politician), elected to Afghanistan's Wolesi Jirga in 2005
 Obaidullah Akhund, Afghan defence minister 
 Obaidullah Aleem, Pakistani poet
 Obaidullah Baig, Pakistani writer
 Obaidullah Hamzah (born 1972), Bangladeshi Islamic scholar
 Obaidullah Karimi, Afghan footballer
 Azmi Maulana Obaidullah Khan, Indian National Congress politician
 Obaidullah Rameen, Afghan politician

Ubaydallah
 Ubayd-Allah ibn Abd-Allah, hadith narrator
 Ubayd Allah al-Mahdi Billah, founder of the Fatimid dynasty
 Ubayd-Allah ibn Jahsh, brother of Zaynab bint Jahsh
 Ubayd Allah Abu Marwan, Spanish military personnel
 Ubayd Allah ibn Umar, son of Caliph Umar
 Ubayd-Allah ibn Ziyad, a son of Ziyad ibn Abi Sufyan

Others
 Obeid Allah ibn al-Habhab, important Umayyad official in Egypt from 724 to 734
 Ubaydah ibn al-Harith, son of Harith ibn Abd al-Muttalib
 Abū 'Ubayd 'Abd Allāh al-Bakrī, Andalusian-Arab geographer and historian

Surname
Talha ibn Ubayd-Allah, a companion of Muhammad
 Abu Zafar Obaidullah, Bangladeshi writer
Dean Obeidallah, American comedian

Habibah binte Ubayd-Allah, daughter of Ubayd-Allah ibn Jahsh

See also
Al-Ubaid (disambiguation), for the various uses and romanizations of the root name Ubayd
 Ubaydul Haq (disambiguation) and variants

Arabic-language surnames
Arabic masculine given names
Theophoric names